Romania competed at the 2016 Summer Olympics in Rio de Janeiro, Brazil, from 5 to 21 August 2016. Since the nation's participation started in 1900 (and its official debut in 1924), Romanian athletes had appeared in every edition of the Summer Olympic Games, except for two occasions: the 1932 Summer Olympics in Los Angeles during the worldwide Great Depression, and the 1948 Summer Olympics in London.

The Romanian team consisted of 97 athletes, 34 men and 63 women, across 14 sports, their smallest in Summer Olympic history since 1988. For the fourth time in history, Romania fielded more female athletes than males at the Games, due to the proliferation of women in both athletics and rowing making the cut and the comeback of the women's handball squad after being absent from London 2012.

Romania left Rio de Janeiro with four medals (one gold, one silver, and two bronze), signifying the country's poorest performance at the Summer Olympics since 1952. The women's épée team brought home Romania's only gold medal at the Games, beating the top-ranked Chinese team in the final match with the help of early unmatched touches from four-time Olympian Ana Maria Brânză. Horia Tecău and Florin Mergea secured a historic first Olympic tennis medal of any color for their team, a silver in the men's doubles. The women's eight rowing squad made a late surge to obtain the final podium spot, while Russian-born Albert Saritov closed out the nation's overall tally at the Games with a bronze in freestyle wrestling. For the first time since 1972, Romanian athletes failed to earn an Olympic medal in artistic gymnastics.

Originally, Romania collected a total of five medals. On 13 October 2016, the International Olympic Committee stripped weightlifter Gabriel Sîncrăian of his bronze medal after he tested positive for excess testosterone.

Medalists

| width=78% align=left valign=top |

| width=22% align=left valign="top" |

Competitors
Romanian Olympic and Sports Committee (COSR) fielded a team of 97 athletes, 34 men and 63 women, to compete across 14 sports at the Games; it was the nation's smallest delegation sent to the Olympics since 1952. For only the fourth time in history, Romania was represented by more female athletes than males, due to the proliferation of women in both athletics and rowing making the cut, and the comeback of the women's handball squad after being absent from London 2012. Of the 97 participants, 31 of them attended at least a single Olympiad, with the rest making their debut in Rio de Janeiro.

For the first time since 1968, Romania did not send any of the artistic gymnastics squads to the Games, snapping the country's medal streak in the team event after four decades. Track and field accounted for the largest number of athletes on the squad with 22 entries. There was a single competitor in boxing, road cycling, rhythmic gymnastics, and shooting.

Seven of the past Olympic medalists returned, including defending champion Alin Moldoveanu in men's air rifle shooting, triple jumper Marian Oprea, fencers Tiberiu Dolniceanu (men's sabre) and Ana Maria Brânză (women's épée), judoka Corina Căprioriu (women's 57 kg), and gymnastics veterans Marian Drăgulescu, who owned a career tally of three medals leading to his fourth Games, and three-time champion Cătălina Ponor, who was selected as the nation's flag bearer in the opening ceremony, the first by a gymnast in Romania's Olympic history.

Other notable competitors on the Romanian team included tennis player Horia Tecău and his new partner Florin Mergea (both world no. 3) in the men's doubles, Russian-born freestyle wrestler Albert Saritov, handball team captain Aurelia Brădeanu, and coxswain and former gymnast Daniela Druncea of the women's eight rowing crew. Fourteen-year-old swimmer Ana-Iulia Dascăl, who entered the Games through a universality invitation, was Romania's youngest competitor, with race walker Claudia Ștef rounding out the lineup as the oldest member (aged 38).

| width=78% align=left valign=top |The following is the list of number of competitors who participated in the Games. Note that reserves in fencing, field hockey, football, gymnastics, handball and rowing are not counted as athletes:

Athletics

Romanian athletes achieved qualifying standards in the following athletics events (up to a maximum of 3 athletes in each event):

A total of 18 athletes (six men and twelve women) were selected to the Romanian track and field team for the Games, including two-time Olympian Ancuța Bobocel (women's 3000 m steeplechase) and Athens 2004 silver medalist Marian Oprea (men's triple jump).

Track & road events
Men

Women

Field events

Boxing

Romania entered one boxer to compete in the following weight classes into the Olympic boxing tournament. Mihai Nistor was the only Romanian finishing among the top two of his respective weight division in the AIBA Pro Boxing series.

Cycling

Road
Romania qualified one rider in the men's Olympic road race by virtue of his top 200 individual ranking in the 2015 UCI Europe Tour.

Fencing

Romanian fencers qualified a full squad in the women's team épée by virtue of their top four national finish in the FIE Olympic Team Rankings. Meanwhile, 2012 Olympic silver medalist Tiberiu Dolniceanu secured a spot on the Romanian team in the men's sabre by finishing among the top 14 individual fencers in the FIE Adjusted Official Rankings. Foil fencer Mălina Călugăreanu rounded out the Romanian roster by finishing among the top four individuals at the European Zonal Qualifier in Prague, Czech Republic.

Gymnastics

Artistic
Romania did not send any all-around teams to the Olympics for the first time since 1968, despite Cătălina Ponor coming out of retirement. This ended the streak of winning a team medal in the event since 1976. Romania entered three artistic gymnasts into the Olympic competition. Four-time Olympic medalist Marian Drăgulescu claimed his Olympic spot in the men's apparatus and all-around events at the 2015 World Championships, while two more places were awarded to one Romanian male and female gymnast, who participated at the Olympic Test Event in Rio de Janeiro.

Men

Women

Rhythmic 
Romania qualified one rhythmic gymnast in the individual all-around for the Games by claiming one of eight available Olympic spots at the Olympic Test Event in Rio de Janeiro.

Handball

Summary

Women's tournament

The Romanian women's handball team qualified for the Olympics by virtue of a top two finish at the second meet of the Olympic Qualification Tournament in Aarhus, Denmark.

Team roster

Group play

Judo

Romania qualified a total of four judokas for the following weight classes at the Games. Daniel Natea, Monica Ungureanu, London 2012 Olympian Andreea Chițu, and silver medalist Corina Căprioriu were ranked among the top 22 eligible judokas for men and top 14 for women in the IJF World Ranking List of 30 May 2016.

Rowing

Romania qualified a total of five boats for each of the following rowing classes into the Olympic regatta. Three rowing crews confirmed Olympic places for their boats at the 2015 FISA World Championships in Lac d'Aiguebelette, France, while the rowers competing in the women's lightweight double sculls and women's eight were further added to the Romanian roster as a result of their top two finish at the 2016 European & Final Qualification Regatta in Lucerne, Switzerland.

Men

Women

Qualification Legend: FA=Final A (medal); FB=Final B (non-medal); FC=Final C (non-medal); FD=Final D (non-medal); FE=Final E (non-medal); FF=Final F (non-medal); SA/B=Semifinals A/B; SC/D=Semifinals C/D; SE/F=Semifinals E/F; QF=Quarterfinals; R=Repechage

Shooting

Romania received a wildcard invitation from ISSF to send London 2012 champion Alin Moldoveanu in the men's air rifle to the Olympics, as long as the minimum qualifying score (MQS) was met by 31 March 2016.

Qualification Legend: Q = Qualify for the next round; q = Qualify for the bronze medal (shotgun)

Swimming

Romanian swimmers achieved qualifying standards in the following events (up to a maximum of 2 swimmers in each event at the Olympic Qualifying Time (OQT), and potentially 1 at the Olympic Selection Time (OST)):

Table tennis

Romania fielded a team of five athletes into the table tennis competition at the Games. Ovidiu Ionescu, along with two-time Olympians Elizabeta Samara and Daniela Dodean, were automatically selected among the top 22 eligible players each in their respective singles events based on the ITTF Olympic Rankings. Meanwhile, Adrian Crișan was granted an invitation from the ITTF to compete in the men's singles as one of the next seven highest-ranked eligible players, not yet qualified, on the Olympic Ranking List.

Bernadette Szőcs was awarded the third spot to build the women's team for the Games by virtue of a top 10 national finish in the ITTF Olympic Rankings.

Tennis

Romania entered seven tennis players into the Olympic tournament. Irina-Camelia Begu (world no. 28), Simona Halep (world no. 5), and Monica Niculescu (world no. 37) qualified directly among the top 56 eligible players for the women's singles based on the WTA World Rankings, while London 2012 Olympian Horia Tecău teamed up with his partner Florin Mergea in the men's doubles by virtue of his top 10 ATP ranking as of 6 June 2016. Andreea Mitu and Raluca Olaru received a spare ITF Olympic place freed up by the Italians to join Begu and Niculescu in the women's doubles.

On 15 July 2016, Halep pulled out from the Games due to her concerns about the Zika virus.

Men

Women

Mixed

Weightlifting

Romanian weightlifters qualified three men's and two women's quota places for the Rio Olympics based on their combined team standing by points at the 2014 and 2015 IWF World Championships. The team had to allocate these places to individual athletes by 20 June 2016.

On 19 November 2015, the International Weightlifting Federation decided to strip one men's entry place from Romania because of "multiple positive cases" of doping.

Wrestling

Romania qualified a total of four wrestlers for each of the following weight classes into the Olympic competition. One of them finished among the top six to book Olympic spot in the men's Greco-Roman 98 kg at the 2015 World Championships, while another Olympic berth was awarded to the Romanian wrestler who progressed to the top two finals of the women's freestyle 48 kg at the 2016 European Qualification Tournament.

Three further wrestlers claimed Olympic slots to round out the Romanian roster at the Olympic Qualification Tournaments; two of them at the initial meet in Ulaanbaatar and one more in the men's freestyle 98 kg at the final meet in Istanbul.

Men's freestyle

Men's Greco-Roman

Women's freestyle

See also
Romania at the 2016 Summer Paralympics

References

External links 

Olympics
Nations at the 2016 Summer Olympics
2016